Albania participated in the Junior Eurovision Song Contest 2017, which took place in Tbilisi, Georgia on 26 November 2017. The Albanian broadcaster RTSH was responsible for the organization of their representative at the contest. Their entry was selected through Junior Fest 2017, a national selection process consisting of sixteen artists who competed in order to become the Albanian representative on 14 October 2017. Ana Kodra is an Albanian singer who won the selection with the song "Mos ma prekni pemën", meaning "Don't Touch My Tree".

Background

Prior to the 2017 contest, Albania had participated in the Junior Eurovision Song Contest three times since its first entry in 2012, only opting not to participate at the 2013 and 2014 contests. In 2016, Klesta Qehaja represented Albania in Valletta, Malta with the song "Besoj". The country ended in 13th place out of 17 countries, achieving 38 points.

Before Junior Eurovision

Junior Fest 2017
The national final Junior Fest 2017 took place on 14 October 2017. It consisted sixteen competing acts participating in a televised production where the winner was determined by a jury panel. Sixteen songs took part in Junior Fest 2017, which was held in the Palace of Congresses in Tirana. A three-member professional jury, made up of Fatma Methasani, Andi Bajgora and Lum Veseli, selected Ana Kodra as the winner of the selection with the song "Mos ma prekni pemën". The song was later entitled "Don't Touch My Tree" along with the release of the official video on 14 November 2017.

Artist and song information

Ana Kodra

Ana Kodra (born 23 March 2007) is an Albanian singer. She represented Albania in the Junior Eurovision Song Contest 2017 with the song "Mos ma prekni pemën". She finished in 13th place with 67 points.

Ana began performing at the age of eight years old when she participated in the TV show Tú sí que vales. Despite her young age, she managed to go to the final and to create her own fan base. At the age of nine, Ana became part of the TV show Gjeniu i vogël. In addition to that, she won the second prize at the National Children's Festival in Shkodër.

Ana participated in the second series of The Voice Kids Albania where she gave a very impressive and confident performance in the Blind Auditions of the song Evil Like Me from the Disney movie, Descendants. All judges turned their chair, and she picked Miriam Cani as her coach. She finished in the top 6.

In 2019, she auditioned for Britain's Got Talent.

Don't Touch My Tree
"Don't Touch My Tree" (originally Mos ma prekni pemën) is a song performed by Albanian child singer Ana Kodra. It represented Albania in the Junior Eurovision Song Contest 2017.

At Junior Eurovision
During the opening ceremony and the running order draw which took place on 20 November 2017, Albania was drawn to perform tenth on 26 November 2017, following Georgia and preceding Ukraine.

Voting

Detailed voting results

References

Junior Eurovision Song Contest
Albania
2017